Hawthorne station may refer to:

Hawthorne, New Jersey 
Hawthorne station (NJ Transit)

Hawthorne station (New York, Susquehanna and Western Railroad)

Hawthorne, New York 
Hawthorne station (Metro-North)

Cicero, Illinois 
Hawthorne station (Illinois Central Railroad)

See also 
Hawthorne (disambiguation)
Hawthorn (disambiguation)
Hawthorne House (disambiguation)
 Hawthorn railway station, Melbourne
 The Hawthorns station
 Hawthorn Station, Illinois